Kannada prosody (ಕನ್ನಡ ಛಂದಸ್ಸು (Kannada Chhandassu)) is the study of metres used in Kannada poetry, describing the rhythmic structure of a verse. The metres used include some metres borrowed from other traditions, and indigenous metres. Kannada literature, especially Old Kannada poetry, clearly exhibits the importance poets placed on metre. This can be seen in the number of types of metre used in Kannada poetry.

History
The earliest Kannada work on prosody was the Guṇagānkiyam, which has been lost. Nagavarma I wrote a fairly complete work on prosody , called Chandombudhi. With a few additions by later writers, it still remains a standard work on Kannada prosody.

Subdivisions
Kannada metres are categorised as Amsha and Maatra (syllabic and quantitative), or as Vaidika and Laukika metres.

Amsha metres
Amsha metres are based on Amsha or a unit consisting of short or long syllables which may be extended to modify time required to pronounce them. Amshas are named as Brahma, Vishnu and Rudra based on number of Amshas in it: 2, 3 or 4, respectively. Tripadi, Sangatya and some Amsha Shatpadi belong to Amsha metre category. Kannada vachanas and Yakshagana poems are composed in these metres. There are also Amsha Shatpadis.

Maatra metres
Maatra metres are based on Maatras. A Maatra is a unit of time. One Maatra is denoted as U and is called Laghu. Two Maatra is denoted as -. There are a set of rules to decide if a letter in a poem takes one or two Maatra time. Maatra Shatpadi and Ragale, for example belong to this group. Harichandra Kavya, Jaimini Bharata are poems composed in these metres.

Vaidika metres
Vaidika metres are based on Sanskrit Vedic metres such as Vaidika Anustup, Gayatri and Tristup etc. These are Akshara metres or syllabic metres based on number of syllables and lines.

Laukika metres
Laukika metres are Vaidika metres used in a more constrained manner to instill more rhythmic regularity. Anustup is an example. The Sanskrit Ramayana by Valmiki is composed in Laukika Anustup metre. There are very few poems composed in Kannada in these metres and this category is mostly of academic interest in Kannada.

Popular indigenous metres
 Ragale
 Shatpadi
 Dwipadi
 Tripadi
 Chaupadi
 Saangatya - Siribhoovalaya, considered one of the finest mysteries of ancient Kannada literature, follows this style.

Popular adopted metres
 Stragdara Mala
 Shardula Vikridita
 Mattebha Vikridita

Modern Kannada metres
 Sarala Ragale

Modern Kannada poets use flexible metrical structure, sometimes completely neglecting rhythm patterns and focusing completely on the emotional value of lyric. These lyrics are being studied and new patterns inherent in them are being formalized.

References

Books
 
 

Kannada language
Prosodies by language
Indian poetics